The Peter Burr House was built between 1751 and 1755 near present-day Shenandoah Junction, West Virginia, making it one of the oldest houses in West Virginia. Burr, whose first cousin was Aaron Burr, was one of the first settlers in the area.  It is the oldest surviving post-and-beam-construction house in West Virginia. The  property was acquired from Burr family descendants in the 1990s and has been under restoration by Jefferson County Historic Landmarks Commission.

Description
The taller section of the house is the oldest, with brick filling in between log framing, covered with hand-riven clapboards. The steeply-pitched roof overhangs the larger section on both the north and south elevations. An addition, lower in height, dates to 1804, and features a large limestone chimney. A two-story springhouse lies to the west of the main house.

The oldest portion of the Burr house has a hall-and-parlor arrangement, with the hall and parlor reversed from their usual precedence, so that the parlor is at the front door. A log kitchen was built in the 18th century, which was attached to the core of the house in 1813 with an intervening room.

History
Burr lived on the property until his death in 1795. As a cousin of Burr, and an associate of nearby landowners and soldiers Charles Lee and Horatio Gates, and an opponent of the Washington family, who also owned land in the area.

The Jefferson County Historic Landmarks Commission has built a replica barn on the property.

References

External links

Peter Burr House at Jefferson County Historic Landmarks]
The Peter Burr House Restoration
Jefferson County Historic Landmarks Commission - Preservation Efforts

Houses on the National Register of Historic Places in West Virginia
Houses in Jefferson County, West Virginia
Houses completed in 1755
Burr family
National Register of Historic Places in Jefferson County, West Virginia
Historic American Buildings Survey in West Virginia
Colonial architecture in West Virginia